The Andersonian Library is the university library of the University of Strathclyde in Glasgow, Scotland.  Established in 1796, it is one of the largest of its type in Scotland.

Access to the Library is restricted to Strathclyde student and other library membership card holders., retired staff and corporate members.

History
The Andersonian was formed in 1796 on the death of John Anderson when he bequeathed his collection, which consisted of over 2000 volumes. This is what formed the nucleus of the library. The Andersonian was originally housed within the buildings of Andersons Institution on George Street, before being relocated to the Royal College Building upon its opening in 1912.  The library moved to the new McCance Building designed by Ralph Covell on Richmond Street in 1964 shortly before the Royal College gained its Charter to become the University of Strathclyde.

However by the mid 1970s, the library was outgrowing the McCance Building, and by this point the University had purchased the former printing works of William Collins, Sons on Cathedral Street.  The newest building on this site was a giant warehouse and printing press building that was originally constructed in 1961, and whilst much of the rest of the Collins estate was demolished by the University, this structure was converted into the third home of the Library.  The former library area in the McCance Building became the home for Registry and main administrative functions of the university.

The building itself is named after Sir Samuel Curran, the Principal who had masterminded Strathclyde's genesis as a university and served between 1964 and 1980. The current location into which the Andersonian moved in 1980  for the 1980-81 academic year - the new library was officially opened the following year.

John Anderson, a Professor of Natural Philosophy at Glasgow University, left his personal library of 1,500 volumes which formed the basis of the Andersonian Library's historical and nurtured items. Two other important collections were added to the library's stock in the following century: 500 volumes from the library of Alexander Laing, a Professor of Mathematics at Anderson's University, and 1,400 volumes from James Young of Kelly and Durris, who was President of Anderson's College. The library of the Royal College had strong collections in the fields of applied sciences and technology.

During Summer 2012 the first phase of the University Library redevelopment project was completed. In recent years the floors of the Library were upgraded. During June 2012 the Jordanhill Library was closed and stock and services were integrated into this Library on the John Anderson campus. This project brought all Library and information services into a single location. There are more group study areas and improved silent study spaces. Digital collections are continually being enhanced, opening hours are being increased and heating, lighting and ventilation have all been upgraded.

Services

The Andersonian Library is split up into several different zones, spread over 5 levels. Levels 1, 4 and 5 are designated for silent study. Level 3 is the entrance floor and hosts the Library and IT helpdesk as well as the majority of the library's computers, and is designated a 'quiet' study area. Level 2 is the group discussion floor and has a number of facilities for group study, such as bookable rooms and large tables. A new group study area opened in 2014 as part of the library's ongoing renovation. There are small group study rooms, discussion areas, an Assistive Technologies room and Education Resources Centre for the university's education students.

The Library provides free internet access through the desktop computers, eduroam Wi-Fi, or through a handful of hardwired Ethernet ports.

The library's 'SUPrimo' catalogue search interface allows students and staff to search the library's database in order to find print or electronic copies of books which the library keeps in stock. SUPrimo also allows users to reserve books and requisition material from storage.

The entrance foyer houses a take-away coffee kiosk, and a branch of the university-run Nourish café.

For most of the term time the library is open between 07:00 and 00:00 on weekdays, and from 09:00 to 21:00 on Saturdays and Sundays. Enquiries services are staffed between 08:30 and 20:30 during the week and from 12:00 until 17:00 at weekends.

During examination periods the library is open 24 hours a day, seven days a week.

Notable Collections

The library holds around 3,200 volumes from John Anderson, Alexander Laing and James Young collectively, all from a period between 1490 and the end of the 19th century. There is also one incunable of note. German and Latin imprints are also available within the library and hold a modest 20 percent and 25 percent respectively.

The Scottish Mountaineering club (established in 1889) has also deposited books within the library. Throughout the years, members, authors and publishers have all donated books to the collection making most  publications, journals and famous guidebooks available within the library. This collection is on deposit from The Scottish Mountaineering though, meaning at any-point a member of the club can borrow items from the collections (on production of a club membership card).

One of the more interesting pieces of work within the library's Special Collections is the James Young Collection, an industrial chemist and originator of the paraffin and shale oil industry in Scotland. The collection contains books and manuscripts on alchemy and early science dating from the 15th to the 19th century and is listed in a printed bibliography, Bibliotheca Chemica (Glasgow, 1906) by John Ferguson.

The library is home to many rare books (many with less than 3 copies in existence); however, these books are not available for removal outwith the library. The use of these books are only available for use within the library.
Among other notable works within the library there are some by Agrippa Von Nettesheim and a volume by the grammarian Joannes Claius on rural economy.

Finally, the Andersonian Library also contains a "Strathclyde Collections" section which was created in order to conserve as complete a record as possible of publications relating to the University. It contains works by members of staff, official publications of the University, its departments and faculties and publications about the university.

Building Layout

References 

 

Academic libraries in Scotland
University of Strathclyde
Libraries in Glasgow
1796 establishments in Scotland